Katarin Quelennec (born 28 May 1980) is a French former swimmer who competed in the 2000 Summer Olympics and in the 2004 Summer Olympics.

References

1980 births
Living people
French female freestyle swimmers
Olympic swimmers of France
Swimmers at the 2000 Summer Olympics
Swimmers at the 2004 Summer Olympics
European Aquatics Championships medalists in swimming